Play Business is the first crowdfunding site for start ups in Mexico, with a business model distinct from other crowdfunding sites. It offers equity in the start up instead of direct compensation for investors.

History

Started in 2014, the site has several co-founders, including Joan Segura (currently the general director), Fernanda de Velasco and Marc Oyamburu. Oyamburu's and Segura's experience with video games is behind the idea of the site, both involved in play, critiquing and creating game worlds. As a college student, Oyamburu came across the idea of gamification of real world activities, which is behind the name Play Business. In addition, Oyamburu is a lawyer and economist, which allowed him to develop the idea despite being told it could not be done for legal or financial reasons. The business started with an initial investment of 200,000 pesos, most of which went into paying for servers and the development of the site. The website officially went on-line in March 2015, while still using the laundry room of Joan Segura's parents' house. The company grew 700% in its first year and 300% and 100% in the following years. More recently, the company has been able to rent larger space to allow for offices and are now located in the Condesa neighborhood of Mexico City.

As of April 2018, the site has supported over 85 start ups and attracted over 115 million pesos for projects, with 50,000 registered users. Its first client was Briko Robotics, with a goal of 645,000 pesos and even financed itself in part through its own site. Another success story for the site is Tumbiko, a jewelry enterprise which now employs about 1,000 people. However, the management has stated that it has not grown to the level of other online funding site due to lack of funding.

In February 2015, the platform reached its beta version.

The platform has alliances with organizations which provide investment and other support to start ups. In October 2016, Startup Studio Monterrey signed a contract to collaborate with Play Business.

After the election of President Trump at the end of 2016, the site saw a sudden increase in participation. In thirteen days, projects garnered six million pesos, breaking a record.

Business model

The business model of the company was created to help Mexican entrepreneurs find new and more modern ways to finance start ups, as well as provide investors alternatives to investing abroad. The company believes that a weak peso against the dollar is good for them as it makes U.S. investments less attractive, leading investors to look for alternatives.

Its funding method is different from Kickstarter and Indiegogo, and the company claims it is the only one of its type in the world. Instead of offering products or souvenirs to contributors, entrepreneurs, investors and Play Business enter into a contract, with investors offered equity and say in the running of the start up.  This percentage is between nine and eleven percent of the total value of the company. The model is called crowd equity rather than crowdfunding.

It is an integral model, broken down into steps. Entrepreneurs are called “makers” and investors “players.” While it welcomes projects of all types, it does select those it believes truly addresses a market need with a viable business plan and growth potential. Only about ten percent of applying start ups make it to the platform. Prospective makers must attend a boot camp to develop their idea, learn about investment tools, how to value their company and how to offer players a role. They do not receive their money immediately, but rather in stages as the project reaches milestones. In this way, players can decide at any time to withdraw from the “game,” limiting their risk.

Joan Segura describes the business as a "scale up" as it emphasizes the execution of the project in stages. For example, instead of having makers write a business plan on paper, they get the new businesses out to recruit investors. 

The idea is that if everyone “plays well” (jugar bien in Spanish), everyone wins. The goal of players is to increase the value of their investment and the goal of the makers is to keep the players. If a players retires from the “game,” others can buy his/her share.

Minimum investment for players is 100 pesos per month, but they can invest up to about 500,000 pesos. If a contributor invests four percent or more of the initial investment, s/he becomes an associate of the enterprise and is able to further invest with or without Play Business. Makers report to players every month as well as a trimester report.

Play Business charges 5% of the investment, but only if the business reaches its goal amount. 

Play Business estimates that about 30% of a business's initial investment from the platform comes from friends and family.

References

Financial services companies established in 2014